Jatun Q'asa (Quechua jatun, hatun big, great, q'asa mountain pass, "great mountain pass", Hispanicized spelling Jatun Khasa, Jatúncasa) is a mountain in the Tunari mountain range of the Bolivian Andes, about  high. It is situated north-west of Cochabamba in the Cochabamba Department, Quillacollo Province, in the west of the Quillacollo Municipality.

See also 
 Puma Apachita
 Tunari

References 

Mountains of Cochabamba Department